NGC 1806 is a globular cluster located within the Large Magellanic Cloud within the constellation of Dorado (the dolphin-fish), an area of the sky best seen from the Earth's southern hemisphere. It was discovered in 1836 by the British astronomer John Herschel. At an aperture of 50 arcseconds, its apparent V-band magnitude is 11.00, but at this wavelength, it has 0.05 magnitudes of interstellar extinction.

NGC 1806 is about 1.6 billion years old. All else equal, older star clusters have higher mass-to-luminosity ratios; that is, they have lower luminosities for the same mass.

References

External links 
 
 A Great Ball of Stars — ESA/Hubble Picture of the week

Globular clusters
1806
Dorado (constellation)
Large Magellanic Cloud